The Battle of Sumy was a military engagement which began on 24 February 2022, during the 2022 Russian invasion of Ukraine, as part of the Northeastern Ukraine offensive, and ended on 4 April 2022 when Russia withdrew all of its forces from Sumy Oblast.

On 24 February 2022, the Russian army attempted to capture Sumy, located near the Russia–Ukraine border. Ukrainian paratroopers and territorial defense forces began engaging Russian forces within the city, resulting in heavy urban fighting and the destruction of a Russian tank column. That evening, Ukraine's paratroopers were ordered to withdraw from the city, leaving the city's defense to the a few thousand local volunteers armed with rifles, limited anti-tank weapons and no armed vehicles or heavy weaponry. After four days of failing to capture the city, Russia shifted to encircle and bypass the city, where they were then subject to guerrilla ambushes.

On 4 April 2022, Governor of Sumy Oblast Dmytro Zhyvytskyi stated that Russian troops no longer occupied any towns or villages in Sumy Oblast and had mostly withdrawn, while Ukrainian troops were working to push out the remaining units.

Battle

Russian tanks and units began to move into Sumy on 24 February 2022, and fighting began on the outskirts at 03:00. There was an extensive amount of urban warfare between the Ukrainian defenders and Russian forces. A church in Sumy was burned down as a result of the battle.

The fighting between the two forces continued at about 22:30 on 24 February near the Sumy State University, where the Ukrainian 27th Artillery Brigade was stationed. At 01:39 on 25 February, reports said that the Russian forces had retreated from the city.

On 26 February, fighting again broke out on the streets of Sumy. Russian forces were able to capture half of the city. By the end of the day, Ukrainian forces had recaptured the entire city. Ukrainian forces also allegedly destroyed a convoy of Russian fuel trucks. Mayor Oleksandr Lysenko reported three civilian deaths on 26 February, including one killed when Russian BM-21 Grad vehicles fired missiles into Veretenivka, a residential area in the eastern part of Sumy.

On the morning of 27 February, a column of Russian vehicles advanced into Sumy from the east. A civilian car was shot at, resulting in civilian casualties. Russian forces reportedly ran out of supplies and began attempting to loot markets.

On 28 February, Ukrainian forces claimed that Ukrainian Baykar Bayraktar TB2 unmanned combat aerial vehicles destroyed many Russian vehicles, including 96-100 tanks, 20 BM-21 Grad vehicles, and 8 fuel carriers.

On 1 March, over 70 Ukrainian troops were killed during an attack on a military barracks in Okhtyrka.

On 3 March, Dmytro Zhyvytskyi, governor of Sumy Oblast, stated that five people were injured from shelling on buildings of the 27th Artillery Brigade and the military department at Sumy State University. More than 500 international students were trapped since roads and bridges out of the city had been destroyed and fighting was reported in the streets of Sumy.

Zhyvytskyi stated on 8 March that 22 civilians and four soldiers were killed overnight due to a Russian airstrike hitting a residential area. An evacuation of civilians from the city began during the day under an agreement for a humanitarian corridor reached with Russia. Zhyvytskyi later stated that about 5,000 people were evacuated during the day.

On 21 March, an airstrike damaged a fertilizer factory in Sumy, leaking out ammonia and contaminating the surrounding ground. Russia denied that it was responsible and instead suggested the incident was a false flag operation by Ukraine.

On 4 April 2022, Governor Zhyvytskyi declared that Russian troops no longer occupied any towns or villages in Sumy Oblast and had mostly withdrawn. According to Zhyvytskyi, Ukrainian troops were working to push out the remaining units. On 8 April 2022, he stated that all Russians troops had left Sumy Oblast, but it was still unsafe due to rigged explosives and other ammunition Russian troops had left behind.

Renewed skirmishes 

Despite Russian forces withdrawing fully from Sumy Oblast by early April, airstrikes continued throughout April and May.

In mid-May, Russian troops made numerous attempted border crossings in the Sumy area. On 17 May, 5 civilians were wounded by Russian shelling in Sumy Oblast. Shelling of the region from Russia continued for the remainder of the year.

See also 
 Siege of Chernihiv
 Battle of Kyiv (2022)
 Russian occupation of Sumy Oblast

References 

 
February 2022 events in Ukraine
March 2022 events in Ukraine